Walter Atkinson (31 August 1920 - June 2009) was a professional footballer who played as a wing-half.

He made a single appearance for Norwich City on 2 April 1952 against Southend United at Carrow Road, playing at right-half. He had previously played for Hexham Hearts.

References

Bibliography
 

1920 births
Norwich City F.C. players
English footballers
2009 deaths
Association football midfielders